Robbins Pond is a  warm water pond in East Bridgewater and Halifax, Massachusetts. It is part of the Taunton River Watershed. The inflow is Poor Meadow Brook, and the outflow is the Satucket River.The water is brown in color with a transparency of five feet, and the bottom is a mixture of sand and gravel. Average depth is four feet and maximum depth is just ten  feet.

The pond is located off Pond Street in East Bridgewater, one mile (1.6 km) from Route 106. Access is an informal gravel launch area near the pond's outlet. It is suitable only for car top boats and canoes.

External links
MassWildlife - Pond Maps

Ponds of Plymouth County, Massachusetts
Taunton River watershed
Ponds of Massachusetts